Andrzej Józef Drawicz (20 May 1932 – 15 May 1997) was a Polish essayist, literary critic and translator of Russian literature.

Career 

In recognition of his outstanding services in public activity and for achievements in literary and journalistic work, he was posthumously honoured with the Commander's Cross with Star of the Order of Polonia Restituta by Polish President Aleksander Kwaśniewski on 16 May 1997.

References

Bibliography 
 

1932 births
1997 deaths
20th-century Polish male writers
20th-century translators
Burials at Powązki Military Cemetery
Commanders with Star of the Order of Polonia Restituta
Polish essayists
Polish literary critics
Polish literary historians
Polish translators
Russian–Polish translators
University of Warsaw alumni
Writers from Warsaw